A boat train is a passenger train operating to a port for the specific purpose of making connection with a passenger ship, such as a ferry, ocean liner, or cruise ship. Through ticketing is normally available. 

Notable named boat trains

Admiraal de Ruijter,  –  (1987– 2006)
Benjamin Britten, London Liverpool Street – Amsterdam Centraal (1987– ?)
La Flèche d'Or (Golden Arrow), Paris Gare du Nord – Calais-Maritime (1929–1972)
The Golden Arrow, London Victoria – Dover Marine (1929–1972)
The Cunarder
London Waterloo – Southampton Docks (Ocean Terminal)
London Euston – Liverpool Riverside
Glasgow Central – Greenock Prince’s Pier
Night Ferry,  – Paris Nord / Brussels Midi/Zuid (1936–1980)
The Statesman, London Waterloo – Southampton Docks (Ocean Terminal)
The Steam Boat, Toronto – Port McNicoll

See also

Train ferry, which carries rail vehicles as well as passengers
Dutchflyer, London to Amsterdam
Lyttelton Line Boat trains, New Zealand
On the Wigan Boat Express, a song
Venice-Simplon Orient Express, London to Paris and beyond

References

Further reading

Ferries
Intermodal passenger transport
Trains